Mesophleps catericta is a moth of the family Gelechiidae. It is found in Namibia and South Africa (Limpopo, Mpumalanga).

The wingspan is 16–17 mm. The forewings are greyish brown, sprinkled with greyish white scales.

References

Moths described in 1927
Mesophleps